Edge Development Option (EDO) comprises a set of C++ computer libraries produced by Boeing that allows to quickly build 2D and 3D visualization software similar to Google Earth, in order to display satellite imagery and create virtual scenarios for displaying sensor, 3D models, 4D (time-dependent) tracks and for line-of-sight and smart volume analysis. EDO is a toolkit based on EDGE Whole Earth, a software program developed by a company named Autometric, now part of Boeing. While EDGE was initially mainly developed for SGI machines, EDO is mainly Windows-based. EDO retained much of EDGE's functionality but allowed greater flexibility for developers, i.e. the ability to integrate EDO functionality into their own application leveraging on EDO's libraries. Google Earth is the more famous heir to the 3D applications EDGE and EDO.

However, unlike Google Earth, EDO and EDGE were not just 3D or 2D visualisation applications, but they allowed for analysis, e.g. line of sight analysis, and therefore were also used for military applications. EDO provides a continuous display of surveillance and reconnaissance sensors’ positions and fields-of-view, including terrain constraints. The open interface can also deliver real-time data surveillance and reconnaissance feeds using data displayed in a 3-D visualization environment. With precision sensor analysis, satellites and air and ground-based platforms, essential intelligence can be collected in real time. For these reasons, a licensed copy of EDO was also installed in the White House. In addition, outside the United States, the Australian Defence Force uses a licensed copy of this software (FORCE LEVEL EW IN THE AUSTRALIAN DEFENCE FORCE by Anthony Finn, Greg Chalmers, and Adrian Pincombe).

In 2005, EDO was renamed BDO (BattleScape Developer option), and a full-fledged application, named BattleScape, was released together with the toolkit. Mark Turner was the first lead engineer for BDO, followed by Brian Griglak and since 2010 by Valentino Zocca.

References

External links

Official and related sites

 
 Boeing Media Advertising - Boeing Media Advertising
 Remote Sensing Document referencing EDO and EDGE - Remote Sensing Document referencing EDO and EDGE
Boeing News - Boeing Press Release
Boeing News - Boeing Press Release
Application of Network Centric Warfare Concepts to a Land-Air System – an experimentation approach - Research paper citing EDO use

MacOS programming tools
Programming tools for Windows